The 1987 IBF World Championships (World Badminton Championships) were held in Beijing, China, in 1987. Following the results of the women's singles.

Main stage

Section 1

Section 2

Section 3

Section 4

Final stage

External links 
http://newspapers.nl.sg/Digitised/Page/straitstimes19870525.1.27.aspx

1987 IBF World Championships
IBF